Henicops milledgei is a species of centipede in the Henicopidae family. It is endemic to Australia. It was first described in 2004 by Lauren Hollington and Gregory Edgecombe.

Distribution
The species occurs in Victoria, south-eastern Australia. The type locality is the Tarra-Bulga National Park, in the Strzelecki Ranges of South Gippsland.

Behaviour
The centipedes are solitary terrestrial predators that inhabit plant litter and soil.

References

 

 
milledgei
Centipedes of Australia
Endemic fauna of Australia
Fauna of Victoria (Australia)
Animals described in 2004
Taxa named by Gregory Edgecombe